Teodoro P. Malasig (born 10 April 1912, date of death unknown) was a Filipino hurdler. He competed in the men's 400 metres hurdles at the 1936 Summer Olympics.

Malasig first competed as an 18-year-old at the 1930 Far Eastern Championship Games He studied at the College of Agriculture at the University of the Philippines and joined the Upsilon Sigma Phi fraternity. During this time, Malasig represented his university as a quarter miler and in basketball. After World War II, he became an official of the Agricultural Promotion Centre (APC).

References

External links
 

1912 births
Year of death missing
Athletes (track and field) at the 1936 Summer Olympics
Filipino male hurdlers
Olympic track and field athletes of the Philippines
Place of birth missing